Jøssingfjorden is a fjord in Sokndal municipality in Rogaland county, Norway. There is some settlement on the southeastern side of the fjord: the villages of Li, Vinterstø, and Bu. There is a road that runs along the southeast coast of the fjord, with sharp hairpin turns leading down from the mountains to the shore of the fjord both heading north and south from the fjord.

The mine is run by a company called Titania, and the fjord is used as the shipping port for the company. The Nedre Helleren Power Plant is located at the head of the fjord. The electricity is generated by water from lakes located high in the mountains and the water is piped down to the sea level power plant the force of the falling water produces the electricity.

At the head of the fjord is the small Helleren farm which is now abandoned. It sits in a narrow valley with steep rock cliffs on two sides, a rock scree on the third side, and the fjord on the fourth side. The farm is preserved and is now owned by the Dalane folk museum.

Jøssingfjord is a place of iconic importance in the history of Norwegian anti-fascism.

Media gallery

History
The fjord is well known as the location of the World War II-era Altmark incident.

After this incident in the Jøssingfjorden, the term Jøssing came to mean a Norwegian patriot, the opposite of a Quisling (or traitor).  The Norwegian collaborator government tried to neutralize their nickname Quislings by using the Jøssingfjord event to coin a derogatory term Jøssing, referring to "anti-nazis". This attempt backfired, as it was quickly appropriated as a positive term by the Norwegian populace, and in 1943 the word was banned from official use.  As a consequence, the best known illegal Norwegian newspaper got its name from the same incident: Jøssingposten (The Jøssing Post).

See also
 List of Norwegian fjords

References

External links
3D Satellite view of the Jøssingfjord at Live Virtual Earth 3D
Satellite view of the Jøssingfjord at Google maps

Fjords of Rogaland
Sokndal